This is a list of active and extinct volcanoes in Colombia.

See also 

 List of earthquakes in Colombia
 List of fossiliferous stratigraphic units in Colombia
 Geology of Colombia

References 

 
.
Volcanoes
Colombia